Catherine Bonnet (5 March 1965 – 5 February 2023) was a French professional tennis player.

Bonnet competed on the professional tour during the 1980s and had a career high ranking of 192 in the world. Her best performance in a WTA Tour tournament came at the 1988 Aix-en-Provence Open, where she reached the third round with wins over Sabine Auer and Julie Halard.

Bonnet died in Nouméa, New Caledonia on 5 February 2023, at the age of 57.

ITF finals

Singles: 2 (1–1)

References

External links
 
 

1965 births
2023 deaths
French female tennis players